Zeltornis ("Zelten bird") is an extinct genus of heron. It contains a single species, Zeltornis ginsburgi.

Zeltornis probably resembled the modern night herons, but was much larger, standing 2 m (6 ft 8 in) tall and weighing about 15 kg. Its wingspan is estimated at 2.50 m (8 ft 4 in). It is known from a single right coracoid of which the distal part is missing (MNHN collection, uncatalogued). Nonetheless, the partial bone is distinctive enough to place the species clearly into the heron family. In particular it seems to have been allied most closely to the night herons, although it cannot have been a direct ancestor of extant species because the modern genus Nycticorax did already exist in the Oligocene.

Zeltornis is named after the mountain Zelten in Libya, where it was found.

References
 Balouet, Jean Christophe (1981): Zeltornis ginsburgi, n.g. n.sp. (Ardeidae, Aves), Héron géant du Miocène inférieur du Djebel Zelten (Libye). Comptes Rendus des Séances de l'Académie des Sciences (Paris) 293: 235–239. [Article in French]
 Mlíkovský, Jiří (2003): Early Miocene birds of Djebel Zelten, Libya. Časopis Národního muzea, Řada přírodovědná (J. Nat. Mus., Nat. Hist. Ser.) 172: 114–120. PDF fulltext

Ardeidae
Bird genera
Herons
Miocene birds
Cenozoic birds of Africa
Fossil taxa described in 1981
Taxa named by Jean-Christophe Balouet